Aravakurichi taluk is a taluk of Karur district of the Indian state of Tamil Nadu. The headquarters of the taluk is the town of Aravakurichi

Geography & Location
Aravakurichi taluk is located to the south of Karur. It borders Tirupur District in the western side and Dindigul District to the Southern side. Pallapatti is the biggest town in this taluk.

Demographics
According to the 2011 census, the taluk of Aravakurichi had a population of 183037 with 90503  males and 92534 females. There were 1022 women for every 1000 men. The taluk had a literacy rate of 68.75. Child population in the age group below 6 was 7283 Males and 6860 Females.

References 

Taluks of Karur district